Johan H. Enslin is a scientist in the field of electrical engineering, and a Fellow of the Institute of Electrical and Electronics Engineers (IEEE). He has been named as a fellow member for his contributions to integration of renewable energy into power networks and using power electronics.

Education
Johan received the B.S. degree in 1981, the M.S. degree in 1983, and the Ph.D. degree in 1988, all from Rand Afrikaans University, South Africa.

Career
He is currently a Duke Energy Endowed Chaired Professor in Smart Grid at Clemson University.

See also
Sukumar Brahma
Mohammad Shahidehpour

References

South African electrical engineers
Fellow Members of the IEEE
Clemson University faculty
South African scholars
Year of birth missing (living people)
Living people